Slotty Dawes (16 March 1904 – December 1985) was a British sailor. He competed in the Flying Dutchman event at the 1960 Summer Olympics.

References

External links
 

1904 births
1985 deaths
British male sailors (sport)
Olympic sailors of Great Britain
Sailors at the 1960 Summer Olympics – Flying Dutchman
People from Faversham